Hedges Chapel is a historic non-denominational chapel located at 668 Mountain Lake Road in Hedgesville, Berkeley County, West Virginia.  It was built in 1850 and is a 1-story, three-by-two-bay, gable-roofed log building on a fieldstone foundation.  It is sheathed in German siding, added in 1885 and topped by a corrugated metal roof.  Also on the property is the church cemetery, with approximately 100 burials dating to 1872.

It was listed on the National Register of Historic Places in 2002.

Hedges Chapel Story 

In western Berkeley County, West Virginia stands 
Hedges Chapel. For more than 160 years this one-room wooden structure of
simple architecture has been a focus of Christian spirit, faith and 
comfort. It stands on a small hill overlooking the two-lane country road
that leads the congregation to its doors, while its green-shuttered 
windows keep watch over the cemetery where some of its faithful rest.

In the 1840s, the nearest church was six miles away, a
difficult trip on dirt roads, especially in rain or snow. Church was a 
central focus for the community, and local residents began to feel the 
need for a nearby church of their own.  In 1849 several members of the 
community decided to build a church, and. Mr. John Hedges donated land 
for the chapel and cemetery. It is for him that the chapel is named. 
Neighbors cut the trees, donated timber and other materials, and 
provided their labor. A neighbor who operated a nearby sawmill 
volunteered to saw and plane the timber for the structure and the pews. 
Local horses hauled the materials to the building site. Only nails and 
window glass were purchased; everything else was locally made. 
Construction began in the winter of 1849, and in 1850, the Hedges Chapel
opened.  In the chapel's early days worshipers came to services on foot
and on horseback. Later, as the community became more established, the 
faithful began to arrive in buggies.

Hedges Chapel was built as a log structure, although 
its logs are no longer visible. In 1885 its exterior was covered with 
white-painted, German-style, wood plank, and its 15-foot-high interior 
walls were clad in plaster. The original logs remain between the two 
façades silently supporting the chapel, as they have for over 160 years.
Originally the chapel had a simple shingle roof, replaced by a slate 
roof in 1905 and the current metal roof in 1939. Inside the building the
congregation worships on the original pews that were built from planks 
sawn from local trees in 1850.

Hedges Chapel was first established as a Methodist church, the Hedges Stony Lick Run Church.  As years passed, chapel 
membership waxed and waned. In the 1960s and 1970s the chapel was 
closed, reopened and closed again. Finally, in 1977 Hedges Chapel had 
fewer than ten active members, and closed its doors seemingly for good. 
In the 1980s the virtually abandoned building was vandalized and 
stripped of much of its contents. It seemed less and less likely that 
the chapel would ever open its doors again. However, faith prevailed 
over adversity, and, toward the end of the decade the spiritual needs of
the area were renewed.  In a fortunate coupling, local residents were 
again in search of a local church, and a number of part-time residents 
of the new Woods community were in search of a church away from home.

In 1988, Reverend Charles Long, then assistant pastor 
at the Hedgesville United Methodist Church, attempted to revive the old 
church.  Not wanting to see the old chapel waste away, he approached 
several members of the expanding local community and asked if they would
be interested in restarting the old church. He received a very 
enthusiastic response.  Local residents, with the assistance of Reverend
Long, received permission from the Methodist Conference to take over 
the church, under the agreement that it would remain 
interdenominational.

Armed with $3,000 in loans and donations, volunteers 
began their work with the same spirit that the original founders had 
shown 160 years earlier. Some rewired the vandalized electrical system, 
while others completely renovated the chapel's interior and exterior. 
Their hard work, dedication, faith and several thousand dollars more in 
donations infused new life into the old structure. Their efforts came to
fruition on September 10, 1988 when Hedges Chapel, with 26 worshipers, 
was reborn.

Today, when you enter the chapel you will find a 
stark, elegant interior not much altered in over a century. The original
kerosene lanterns that illuminated the chapel have been replaced by 
electric lights, and overhead fans have been added to circulate air. One
of the last of the pioneer vestiges to go was the 1905 wood-burning 
stove, making way for today's baseboard electric heat and heat pumps 
that also provide air conditioning.

As has been the case since the chapel's very 
beginning, a cadre of ministers and lay preachers take turns providing 
the message to the faithful at Hedges Chapel. We are an 
interdenominational congregation and do not have a permanent pastor. 
Membership is open to anyone, and guests are always warmly welcomed.  
This wonderful little chapel building is now a Berkeley County historical
landmark, and welcomes an average of 40 to 50 worshippers each Sunday.

References

Churches on the National Register of Historic Places in West Virginia
Churches in Berkeley County, West Virginia
Churches completed in 1850
19th-century churches in the United States
National Register of Historic Places in Berkeley County, West Virginia